The 2010 LPGA of Japan Tour was the 43rd season of the LPGA of Japan Tour, the professional golf tour for women operated by the Ladies Professional Golfers' Association of Japan. It consisted of 34 golf tournaments, all played in Japan. Ahn Sun-ju won four events and the Order of Merit title.

Tournament results

Events in bold are majors.

The Mizuno Classic is co-sanctioned with the LPGA Tour.

* Ahn Sun-ju's victory at Stanley Ladies marks Korean players' 100th victory since Ku Ok-hee's victory at Kibun Ladies Classic in 1985. (See more detail in Korean players' victories on LPGA of Japan Tour).

See also
2010 in golf

External links
 

LPGA of Japan Tour
LPGA of Japan Tour
LPGA of Japan Tour